Evans Block may refer to:

Evans Block (Sioux City, Iowa), listed on the National Register of Historic Places in Woodbury County, Iowa
Evans Block (Lancaster, New Hampshire), listed on the New Hampshire State Register of Historic Places
Evans Block (Smithville, Tennessee), listed on the National Register of Historic Places in De Kalb County, Tennessee

See also
Evans House (disambiguation)